Adam Greendale (born 17 September 1988) is a professional rugby union player. A fly-half, he is an England Under-19 and Under-20 international. Greendale currently plays for Leeds Carnegie. He previously played for Otley and Rotherham Titans.

In 2009 he was loaned to Bedwas and was selected for the Newport Gwent Dragons regional team against Sale Sharks on 6 November 2009, making his debut as a second-half replacement.

References

External links
 Newport Gwent Dragons profile

1988 births
Living people
Bedwas RFC players
Dragons RFC players
English rugby union players
Leeds Tykes players
Rugby union players from Beverley
Rugby union fly-halves